Zeng Xiaoye (born on February 26, 1991, in Wenzhou, China) is a Chinese snowboarder.

2010 Winter Olympics
He competed at the 2010 Winter Olympics in the Halfpipe.

References

Olympic snowboarders of China
Chinese male snowboarders
Snowboarders at the 2010 Winter Olympics
1991 births
Living people
Sportspeople from Wenzhou
Snowboarders at the 2007 Asian Winter Games
Universiade medalists in snowboarding
Universiade bronze medalists for China
Competitors at the 2009 Winter Universiade